Mark Haynes (born November 6, 1958) is a former American football cornerback in the National Football League who played for the New York Giants and the Denver Broncos from 1980 until 1989. He made three Pro Bowls while playing for New York and appeared in all three of Denver's Super Bowls in the 1980s.

Haynes was a first-round draft pick of the Giants in the 1980 NFL Draft and was instrumental in their 1981 playoff run, which saw the Giants make the playoffs for the first time since 1963.

Mark Haynes has one career touchdown on an interception return, which took place during the 1987 season.  In the 1984 season Haynes had seven interceptions and was named first-team All-Pro.  He ended his career with seventeen total interceptions and four fumble recoveries.

References

1958 births
Living people
Sportspeople from Kansas City, Kansas
American football cornerbacks
New York Giants players
Denver Broncos players
National Conference Pro Bowl players
Colorado Buffaloes football players